In mathematics, and more specifically in abstract algebra, a *-algebra (or involutive algebra) is a mathematical structure consisting of two involutive rings  and , where  is commutative and  has the structure of an associative algebra over . Involutive algebras generalize the idea of a number system equipped with conjugation, for example the complex numbers and complex conjugation, matrices over the complex numbers and conjugate transpose, and linear operators over a Hilbert space and Hermitian adjoints.
However, it may happen that an algebra admits no involution.

Definitions

*-ring

In mathematics, a *-ring is a ring with a map  that is an antiautomorphism and an involution.

More precisely,  is required to satisfy the following properties: 
 
 
 
 

This is also called an involutive ring, involutory ring, and ring with involution. The third axiom is implied by the second and fourth axioms, making it redundant.

Elements such that  are called self-adjoint.

Archetypical examples of a *-ring are fields of complex numbers and algebraic numbers with complex conjugation as the involution.  One can define a sesquilinear form over any *-ring.

Also, one can define *-versions of algebraic objects, such as ideal and subring, with the requirement to be *-invariant:  and so on.

Note that *-rings are unrelated to star semirings in the theory of computation.

*-algebra
A *-algebra  is a *-ring, with involution * that is an associative algebra over a commutative *-ring  with involution , such that .

The base *-ring  is often the complex numbers (with * acting as complex conjugation).

Philosophy of the *-operation
The *-operation on a *-ring is analogous to complex conjugation on the complex numbers. The *-operation on a *-algebra is analogous to taking adjoints in complex matrix algebras.

Notation
The * involution is a unary operation written with a postfixed star glyph centered above or near the mean line:
 , or 
  (TeX: x^*),
but not as ""; see the asterisk article for details.

Examples
 Any commutative ring becomes a *-ring with the trivial (identical) involution. 
 The most familiar example of a *-ring and a *-algebra over reals is the field of complex numbers  where * is just complex conjugation.
 More generally, a field extension made by adjunction of a square root (such as the imaginary unit ) is a *-algebra over the original field, considered as a trivially-*-ring. The * flips the sign of that square root.
 A quadratic integer ring (for some ) is a commutative *-ring with the * defined in the similar way; quadratic fields are *-algebras over appropriate quadratic integer rings.
 Quaternions, split-complex numbers, dual numbers, and possibly other hypercomplex number systems form *-rings (with their built-in conjugation operation) and *-algebras over reals (where * is trivial). Note that neither of the three is a complex algebra.
 Hurwitz quaternions form a non-commutative *-ring with the quaternion conjugation.
 The matrix algebra of matrices over R with * given by the transposition.
 The matrix algebra of matrices over C with * given by the conjugate transpose.
 Its generalization, the Hermitian adjoint in the algebra of bounded linear operators on a Hilbert space also defines a *-algebra.
 As a partial case, any *-ring is a *-algebra over integers.
 Any commutative *-ring is a *-algebra over itself and, more generally, over any its *-subring.
 For example, any commutative trivially-*-ring is a *-algebra over its dual numbers ring, a *-ring with non-trivial *, because the quotient by  makes the original ring.
 The same about a commutative ring  and its polynomial ring : the quotient by  restores .
 In Hecke algebra, an involution is important to the Kazhdan–Lusztig polynomial.
 The endomorphism ring of an elliptic curve becomes a *-algebra over the integers, where the involution is given by taking the dual isogeny. A similar construction works for abelian varieties with a polarization, in which case it is called the Rosati involution (see Milne's lecture notes on abelian varieties).
Involutive Hopf algebras are important examples of *-algebras (with the additional structure of a compatible comultiplication); the most familiar example being:

Non-Example

Not every algebra admits an involution:

Regard the 2×2 matrices over the complex numbers. Consider the following subalgebra:

Any nontrivial antiautomorphism necessarily has the form:

for any complex number .

It follows that any nontrivial antiautomorphism fails to be idempotent:

Concluding that the subalgebra admits no involution.

Additional structures
Many properties of the transpose hold for general *-algebras:
 The Hermitian elements form a Jordan algebra;
 The skew Hermitian elements form a Lie algebra;
These spaces do not, generally, form associative algebras, because the idempotents are operators, not elements of the algebra.

Skew structures
Given a *-ring, there is also the map .

Elements fixed by this map (i.e., such that ) are called skew Hermitian.

For the complex numbers with complex conjugation, the real numbers are the Hermitian elements, and the imaginary numbers are the skew Hermitian.

See also
Semigroup with involution
B*-algebra
C*-algebra
Dagger category
von Neumann algebra
Baer ring
Operator algebra
Conjugate (algebra)
Cayley–Dickson construction
Composition algebra

Notes

References

Algebras
Ring theory